The National Assembly of the Republic of Vietnam was the national legislature of the Republic of Vietnam.

History
The National Assembly of the Republic of Vietnam had two distinct periods under the two Republics 1955–1963 and 1967–1975. Between the two Republics was a period of military administration under the command of generals, mainly the Revolutionary Military Council, the Armed Forces Council, and the National Leadership Committee. During that period Congress was inactive.

First Republic (1955–1963)
The National Assembly of the First Republic of Vietnam according to the 1956 Constitution has 123 delegates, operating in a single chamber.

Military Rule (1963–1967)
From 1963 until 1967, the Republic of Vietnam did not have a parliament. The generals who came to power had established some mechanism to recruit civilian contributions, but there was no general election at the national level.

Second Republic (1967–1975)
The first National Assembly after the end of the First Republic was the Constituent Assembly, which convened to draft a new constitution for the civil polity, absorbing administrative power from the generals. A total of 532 candidates ran for 117 seats in the September 11, 1966 election. A total of 4,274,872 turned out to vote, representing 80.8% of the registered electorate. About six months later, the basic law was finalized to issue a proclamation on March 18, 1967, the 1967 Constitution. On April 1, 1967, a new Constitution was promulgated.

1967 Elections
The 1967 elections elected the regular parliament and the 1966 constitutional assembly was dissolved. Then the National Assembly of the Second Republic of Vietnam operated within the framework of Chapter III of that constitution. Unlike the First Republic, this National Assembly is divided into two houses: the Senate and the House of Representatives.

Senate
The Senate has 60 members, called "senators", who are elected by the people in a partnership for six-year terms. Each coalition is 10 people, so the Senate is the six coalitions with the most votes. Unlike a member of the House of Representatives, which depends on a locality, the congressional consortium represents the whole country. The headquarters of the Senate is Dien Hong Hall. This building in 2000 was used as the Ho Chi Minh City Stock Exchange.

The last Senate session before the fall of South Vietnam consisted of two groups. One group belongs to the elected term in 1970. The other half belongs to the term elected to 1973, that is, every three years, 30 of the 60 seats in the Senate must be contested. The Senate has 11 standing committees.

As of 1974 the Senate had five blocks:

Democratic Bloc, 22 MPs, pro-government
United Bloc, 17 MPs
The Bong Hue bloc, 8 MPs, opposes the government
Hoa Sen Bloc, 7 MPs, in opposition to the government
Unlinked block (unaffiliated), 6 MPs

House of Representatives
The first House of Representatives (1967–1971) had 137 delegates, called "deputies" who were directly elected by the people based on each locality. By the 2nd term (1971–1975), it was increased to 159 deputies. As of 1974, there was one congressman for every 50,000 voters. The term of parliament is four years. MPs are allocated to work on 18 standing committees. The headquarters of the House of Representatives is the House of the National Assembly in Lam Son Square, after 1975 it was turned into the Ho Chi Minh City Theater.

The last House of Representatives before the fall of the Republic of Vietnam, was elected in August 1971, the 2nd term. The next election was supposed to take place in 1975

In the 1970s the House of Representatives had six blocks:

Republican Bloc, 50 congressmen, pro-government
Independence Bloc, 39 MPs
Ethnic and Social Bloc, 27 MPs, opposes the government under the leadership of lawyer Tran Van Tuyen
National Bloc, 9 MPs
Civil Rights Block, 16 MPs
Unlinked block (unaffiliated), 18 MPs

References 

South Vietnam